Michael Edmund Cardoza (born July 6, 1944) is a defense attorney in California. Prior to his criminal defense work, he worked in three of California's District attorney offices: Los Angeles County, San Francisco County, and Alameda County. Now he currently operates a private practice named Cardoza Law.

Background
In 1971, Michael Cardoza received his J.D. from McGeorge School of Law. He passed the California Bar the same year, and began practicing as a trial attorney in the District Attorney's Offices of Los Angeles, San Francisco, and Alameda County. He worked as a prosecutor for 14 years before he opened his private practice in 1985. His current practice, Cardoza Law Offices, is located in Walnut Creek, California. Since opening his private practice, Cardoza has worked on many high-profile cases such as the Scott Peterson trial and the Barry Bonds steroid scandal. Additionally, he acts as a Judge Pro Tem in Santa Clara County and an arbitrator with the Superior Court of San Francisco.

In addition to operating a private practice in the San Francisco Bay Area, he also acts as a leading legal consultant for radio and television broadcast stations. Previous appearances include: CNN's Larry King Live, 60 Minutes, HBO, The Oprah Winfrey Show, Good Morning America, NBC's Today Show, and 48 Hours.

Cardoza also volunteers time with the trial advocacy program at Stanford University Law School and acts as a guest lecturer.

Notable cases
Some of the most notable cases Cardoza has worked on include:
 The Diane Whipple San Francisco Dog Mauling case: In January 2001, when Diana Whipple returned to her San Francisco apartment, she was attacked and killed by two large dogs in the apartment complex hallway.
Cardoza represented Whipple's domestic partner, Sharon Smith, in her wrongful-death suit against Knoller and Noel, the dog owners. The case challenged the statutes that denied same-sex partners legal standing to bring such a claim. Smith recovered $1.5 million in damages.

 The 2007 SF Zoo Tiger Mauling: On Christmas Day in 2007, a tiger in the San Francisco Zoo jumped out of its enclosure, killed a 17-year-old rock throwing zoo visitor, Carlos Sousa, Jr., and wounded two others. Cardoza and his firm brought charges for negligence, wrongful death, and public nuisance against the San Francisco Zoo on behalf of the parents of Sousa. He argued that regardless of the taunting that occurred, an animal with the potential to cause serious injury or death to zoo visitors should not be able to escape from its enclosure. The amount reached in the settlement was not disclosed.
The Barry Bonds Steroid Scandal: Cardoza represented Stevie Hoskins, best friend of San Francisco Giants hitter, Barry Bonds. Hoskins testified before the Grand Jury that indicted Barry Bonds for perjured statements about his steroid use.
People v. Murphy Murder Trial: Cardoza's client, James Murphy, was charged with capital murder in a drug raid gone wrong in San Mateo, California. The murder occurred in a family home in the 1970s and remained an unsolved crime until the early 2000s. Cardoza and his litigation team worked to undermine the testimony of the witnesses. The case ended up being the first not-guilty verdict in San Mateo County in over 20 years.
The Scott Peterson Case:  In 2004, Scott Peterson received a guilty verdict for the murder of his wife, Laci, and the couple's unborn child. Cardoza appeared on CNN and Fox News as legal analyst in Scott Peterson Discussion Panels  However, once Cardoza became personally involved with the case, the court placed a gag order on him. As part of the preparation for the case, Peterson's attorney reached out to Cardoza for assistance in cross examining his client and determining whether Peterson should take the stand.
Your Black Muslim Bakery: Cardoza defended the company in a felony assault case. The jury arrived at a not-guilty verdict. This was the lead off case in the Chauncey Bailey Murder trials.
 In 2010, the defendant Bey was charged with a felony assault in which the victim suffered various injuries. Bey, Cardoza's client, was one of a number of men allegedly attacking the victim. The jury found Bey not guilty because of lack of evidence.
The Marlene Corrigan Trial Cardoza defended Marlene Corrigan, who faced severe charges of child abuse to her 13-year-old daughter, Christine. Christine weighed well over 600 pounds when she died in November 1996. Despite Marlene's attempts to help control her daughter's weight, Christine's obesity brought about her untimely death. At the time of her demise, Christine had sores on her body and could no longer attend school. The death of Christine sparked a debate as to the responsibilities of parents in controlling obesity in their children.

Cardoza also worked as the lead attorney in the Christine Hubbs case. Hubbs was charged with over 60 counts of unlawful sexual encounters with two 14-year-old males. Her bail reached $4.3 million. Her case settled and she faces 5 years in state prison. Cardoza continues to handle other high-profile cases such as that of Officer Norman Wielsch. As head of the drug task force team, he allegedly stole  confiscated narcotics from Contra Costa County, California and later sold them for personal profits. His bail was reduced from $900,000 and is currently set at $400,000.

Publications
Beyond A Reasonable Doubt
In 2006, Michael Cardoza contributed an article, "Troubling Changes in the Prosecution of Cases: How Prosecutors have allowed the Media and Politics to affect their Discretion" to Larry King's book Beyond A Reasonable Doubt. Cardoza provided an analysis of the effects of political pressures and media on the criminal justice system.

Cardoza has also been featured in Diablo Magazine, Time Magazine and Sports Illustrated.

Honors
Michael Cardoza is a Top 100 Trial Lawyer as deemed by the American Trial Lawyer's Association. Diablo Magazine also deemed Michael Cardoza's advocacy skills as the "Best in the Bay".

References

External links 
 CNN Transcript
 Time Magazine
 Local News
 ABC Local News
 ESPN
 The Cardoza Law Offices
 News
  http://video.foxnews.com/v/3919251/holloway-cover-up
 http://www.cbsnews.com/video/watch/?id=5309255n
 http://abclocal.go.com/kgo/story?section=news/local&id=5891711
 https://web.archive.org/web/20101126222341/http://www.ktvu.com/video/23833595/index.html

American lawyers
Living people
1944 births